"Rise to the Occasion" is a song by English pop duo Climie Fisher, from their debut album Everything. Released as a single in 1987 as the fourth single from the album, it was a top 20 hit in seven countries, including the Netherlands and South Africa where it reached No. 1.

A popular remix by PWL's Phil Harding and Jamie Bromfield called the "Hip Hop Mix" was also released as the A-side on 7" and 12" formats. It was after the success of this mix that "Love Changes (Everything)" was re-released in 1988 and became a much bigger hit this time round. The song's music video was directed by Dieter Trattmann.

In 1989, Jermaine Jackson covered "Rise to the Occasion" as a duet with La La for his album Don't Take It Personal.

Charts

Weekly charts

Year-end charts

References

1987 songs
1987 singles
Climie Fisher songs
Songs written by Simon Climie
Songs written by Dennis Morgan (songwriter)
Songs written by Rob Fisher (British musician)
EMI Records singles
Song recordings produced by Stephen Hague
Number-one singles in the Netherlands
Number-one singles in South Africa